The 87th Massachusetts General Court, consisting of the Massachusetts Senate and the Massachusetts House of Representatives, met in 1866 during the governorship of Alexander H. Bullock. Joseph Adams Pond served as president of the Senate and James M. Stone served as speaker of the House.

Notable legislation included the Factory Inspection Act which aimed to  improve workplace safety.

Senators

Representatives

See also
 39th United States Congress
 List of Massachusetts General Courts

References

Further reading
  (includes description of legislature)

External links

 
 

Political history of Massachusetts
Massachusetts legislative sessions
massachusetts
1866 in Massachusetts